G.P. is an Australian television series produced by Roadshow, Coote & Carroll for the Australian Broadcasting Corporation, the series was broadcast for 8 seasons between 1989 and 1996.

Synopsis
The series, screened on the ABC, is set around a fictional general medical practice, in the vein of the Seven Network serial A Country Practice. Whereas A Country Practice, hence the title was set in a rural setting, G.P. was set at a clinic in an inner-Sydney suburb, and explored both the personal and professional lives of the general practitioners working together, and the other doctors and staff who worked there, as well as patients who attend the surgery.

History and popularity
The series began on-air in March 1989, and while it initially failed to attract a major audience it went on to win numerous television awards (including the first Logie Award for an ABC-TV Drama in 15 years) and became the highest rating drama series on ABC-TV. G.P. ran for 8 seasons and a book about the series was written by producer Harvey Shore.

Cast

Main cast 
 Michael Craig as Dr. William Sharp 
 John McTernan as Dr. Robert Sharp 
 Michael O'Neill as Dr. Steve Harrison 
 Sarah Chadwick as Dr. Cathy Mitchell 
 Denise Roberts as Julie Winters 
 Brian Rooney as Michael Winters 
 Judy McIntosh as Dr. Nicola Tanner 
 Marilynne Paspaley as Dr. Tessa Korkidas 
 Tony Llewellyn-Jones as Dr. Ian Browning 
 Damian Rice as Dr. Martin Dempsey 
 Zoe Carides as Dr. Sonia Kapek 
 Steve Bisley as Dr. Henry King 
 Melissa Jaffer as Dr. Maureen Riordan 
 Leah Vandenberg as Dr. Yasmin Richards

Recurring cast 
 Peter Bryant as Dr. Chris Wright 
 Theresa Wong as Su-Lin Chenn 
 Dominic Elmaloglou as Peter Browning 
 Janelle Owen as Zoe Browning 
 Tracie Sammut as Donna Browning 
 Sue Walker as Eva Fowler 
 Lenka Kripac as Vesna Kapek

Character summary 
G.P. features 2 major characters, who run the clinic:

Mr. William Sharp (Michael Craig) In the beginning of the series Mr. Sharp is a part-time general surgeon with consulting rooms at the Ross St. Surgery owned by his nephew, Dr. Robert Sharp. As the series progressed he bought into the surgery with and started operating again at local public hospitals. William is characterised as a part of the 'old school' style of medicine. He can be quite forthcoming and stubborn in his opinions and is often at odds with his colleagues at the surgery. William served in World War II as a doctor and was a prisoner at the infamous Changi Prison. William drives a Jaguar and is very cultured with a great interest in and knowledge of music, poetry, food and wine.

Dr. Robert Sharp (John McTernan) Originally the owner of Ross Street Surgery, Robert lives in the upstairs level of the house. The surgery was his father's and Robert took it over and raised his own family there. Robert is a widower and has a son Andrew, who makes numerous appearances in the first few series of the show. Uncle William lives with Robert and has his consulting rooms in the surgery. Like his Uncle William, Robert is very cultured but is often the more rational, liberal and socially minded of the pairing. Midway through the series, Robert develops a brain tumor. He is operated on to remove the tumor and survives, only to suffer a heart attack and die in recovery.

Episodes

Season 1 (1989)

Season 2 (1990)

Season 3 (1991)

Season 4 (1992)

Season 5 (1993)

Season 6 (1994)

Season 7 (1995)

Season 8 (1996)

International broadcasts
G.P. has been shown in Canada on CBC Country Canada, a digital television station; and in New Zealand (on TV One and TV3), Jordan (on Channel 2), South Africa (Bop TV), Hong Kong (ATV World) and Ireland (on RTE1). In 2008 and 2009, ABC1 re-broadcast Series 3 onwards at 4:30am on weekdays.

In the UK, Central Independent Television, Thames Television and Border Television were the only contractors among the 14 members of the ITV Network to screen the programme for a short period. Thames started the show on Thursdays 1 October 1992 Thursdays and Fridays for half-hour episodes at 3.20pm until the end of the year. Central axed the show on Thursday 25 March 1993 and replaced it with Shortland Street. The programme was shown in a daily 3.20pm slot Tuesdays to Fridays and had the hour-long episodes split into two to accommodate the half-hour slot. This was a popular format for screening acquired Australian material as had been used with A Country Practice, E Street, Blue Heelers and HeadLand by UK broadcasters.

In 1994, the UK version of The Family Channel aired the series as half-hour editions during the week at 20:30–21:00 on Wednesday and Friday with the episode repeated as an hour long episode on Saturdays at 19:30.

Awards and nominations

Australian Film Institute Awards

Australian Writers' Guild

Human Rights and Equal Opportunity Commission

Logie Awards

References

External links

G.P. at the National Film and Sound Archive
G.P. Episode List

Australian Broadcasting Corporation original programming
Australian medical television series
1989 Australian television series debuts
1996 Australian television series endings
Australian drama television series
English-language television shows
Television shows set in Sydney